Transatlantic is a 1998 Croatian crime film directed by Mladen Juran- Nomination for the main prize in Latin America , Official Competition 15  Mar del Plata International Film Festival (first film in independent Croatia in the official competition of the world's A Festival), 1999. Official program of the Moscow International Film Festival, (A festival), 1999. Winner 4 Golden Arenas Pula Film Festival, 1998. Kodak Award, 1998.  The film was selected as the Croatian entry for the Best Foreign Language Film at the 71st Academy Awards.

PLOT
A movie epic about emigration, roots, America, Croatia, organized crime, love, loneliness, fate, the existential measure of everyone’s life, whether thatlife in monumental, ordinary, null or simply human. This taboo-theme in Croatian culture is brilliantly realized in the genre of a social psychological drama with melodramatic, criminal and adventure elements. This “MichaelCiminoesque” film was successfully presented in Los Angeles cinemas as the Croatian Oscar nomination - for best foreign film in 1998." - R. G. Tilly, 2003. 
Forced by poverty and possible mobilization, Jakov flees to America in 1918., as a war deserter, together with his cousin Luka. The opportunity came when Miho, the owner of the immigration hotel in Pittsburgh sends a letter to Jakov to find him a Croatian wife. A young girl Zorka leaves her home to marry Miho, revolted by the pressure of Jakov's mother, who already married her son with a bit wealthier, but unloved Ivana. In America, Miho understands the situation and instead of marrying Zorka, he is generously sending money home for Jakov's escape. Croats immigrated since the modern migrations ever started. At the beginning of the 20th century they travel mostly as the mariners, as an example four of them were on the first and final voyage of the Titanic. They are leaving in South and North America because of famine and political persecutions. The fate of many immigrants is sublimated in the fate of Jakov and Zorka.

Cast

Filip Šovagović as Jakov
Melita Jurišić as Zorka
Alen Liverić as Jakov's Friend
Josip Genda as Miha
Boris Dvornik as Bare
Ivo Gregurević as Bare's Business Partner
Matija Prskalo as Ivana
Relja Bašić as Boxing Promotor
Slavko Juraga as Franjo
Davor Juriško as Bartender
Galiano Pahor as Italian Immigrant

See also
 List of submissions to the 71st Academy Awards for Best Foreign Language Film
 List of Croatian submissions for the Academy Award for Best Foreign Language Film

References

External links
 
 https://dhfr.hr/redatelj/mladen-juran/

1998 films
1990s Croatian-language films
Croatian drama films
1998 drama films